Choggu Mmanaayili is a community in Sagnarigu District in the  Northern Region of Ghana. It is located along  the Tamale-Kumbungu trunk road. It is a populated community with nucleated settlement.

See also
Suburbs of Tamale (Ghana) metropolis

References 

Communities in Ghana
Suburbs of Tamale, Ghana